Mumbil is a town in the east of central New South Wales, Australia.

History 
In 1950 construction commenced on the Burrendong Dam. The dam workforce was living in Mumbil and led to the development of many new services in the town, including electricity, reticulated water, and garbage collection. A public hall and church were built and the school expanded. A number of new stores opened.

References

External links

Towns in New South Wales
Towns in the Central West (New South Wales)
Dubbo Regional Council
Main Western railway line, New South Wales